Letters to Cleo is an American alternative rock band originating from Boston, Massachusetts, best known for the 1994 single, "Here & Now", from their full-length debut album, Aurora Gory Alice. The band's members are Kay Hanley, Greg McKenna, Michael Eisenstein, Stacy Jones, Scott Riebling, and later, Tom Polce and Joe Klompus.

The group disbanded in 2000 but reunited for a small tour in 2008. In 2016, the band reunited, and on October 14, 2016, released an EP, titled Back to Nebraska.

Band history

Guitarist Greg McKenna and singer Kay Hanley formed the band Letters to Cleo in 1990. The band was initially called Rebecca Lula with Tad Bouve on guitar and Ted Garland on drums with several musicians filling in on bass. In its early phase, the band enlisted various guest players, including a brief period with Abe Laboriel, Jr. as drummer in 1993. The band released a 45 single of Here & Now w/Rimshak featuring Abe Laboriel on drums with Brian Karp on bass. The band's definitive lineup of Hanley, McKenna, Michael Eisenstein on guitar, Stacy Jones on drums and Scott Riebling on bass, was established in 1994. The name "Letters to Cleo" is a reference to Hanley's childhood pen pal. Hanley recounts that her "letters to Cleo" were often returned. She rediscovered a box of these letters during the band-naming process, and the band adopted the name.

Letters to Cleo played gigs in several Boston clubs, including T.T. the Bear's Place and The Rathskellar. They released their first full-length album, Aurora Gory Alice, on CherryDisc Records in 1993. The album received extensive airplay around the New England region and after a much hyped show at South by Southwest in Austin, Letters to Cleo signed a major label record deal with Giant Records, a Warner Brothers subsidiary, and Aurora Gory Alice was re-released worldwide.

The band had their first big hit single with "Here & Now" which gained greater exposure as part of the Melrose Place soundtrack. The song reached No. 10 on the Billboard Modern Rock Singles chart.

In 1995, Letters to Cleo released a follow-up album, Wholesale Meats and Fish. Its release was followed by extensive tours with Our Lady Peace, Sponge, Ned's Atomic Dustbin and others. The single "Awake" achieved moderate rotation on alternative radio. The band also recorded a cover of The Cars song "Dangerous Type" for the major motion picture The Craft.

In 1997, Stacy Jones left the band to join Veruca Salt and was replaced by Tom Polce. That same year, the band released their third album Go!. After a short tour, Polce left the band and was replaced by drummer Jason Sutter. In late 1997, Letters to Cleo parted ways with their record label Giant/Revolution.

1998 saw the release of some early demos and B-sides in the form of the Sister album released originally by Wicked Disc.

Letters to Cleo appeared in the 1999 film 10 Things I Hate about You as a favorite band of the character portrayed by Julia Stiles. They contributed four songs to the soundtrack for the film, which included a Cheap Trick cover ("I Want You to Want Me"), and a Nick Lowe & Ian Gomm cover ("Cruel to Be Kind"). Also included were two original tracks, "Come On", and the beginning of "Co-Pilot" (which can be heard at the end of the scene of their performance at a local club). Whereas the covers appeared on the film's soundtrack, "Come On" was released as an MP3 download on the band's website. "Co-Pilot" was also not on the film's soundtrack, but it appeared on Letters To Cleo's album Go!. In the closing credits, they were mistakenly credited as Letter to Cleo.

During that same year, the band opened for Cheap Trick at The Paradise Club in Boston. The band then recorded 13 new original songs for the Kids' WB cartoon, Generation O!, which aired from 2000 to 2001.

The band played its last show for the next seven years on May 4, 2000, a benefit for their friend and longtime local supporter, Mikey D. They announced their disbandment the following month.

Reunion
In December 2007, an impromptu reunion occurred when four of the original band members appeared at a benefit for longtime supporter Jeanne Connolly, at TT the Bear's Place in Cambridge, Massachusetts. The members reunited officially for a series of shows a year later in Los Angeles, Boston and New York City. More dates followed in 2009 with shows in New Orleans, Dallas, Houston, and Austin. Bassist Scott Reibling did not participate in these shows but gave his blessing. Longtime friend of the band Joe Klompus replaced Reibling.

As of July 2009, the band members returned to their own projects.

In the Parks and Recreation Season 4 episode entitled "The Comeback Kid", the character Ben Wyatt is seen wearing a Letters to Cleo shirt (show star Amy Poehler attended Boston College during the band's early years). This resulted in Letters to Cleo being a trending topic on Twitter. The band reunited to play a fictional concert on the sixth season finale of Parks and Recreation.

Letters to Cleo was reported to be back together and recording new music in February, 2016. The band's Facebook and Twitter feeds have been active with status updates, pictures and videos of ongoing recording.

Letters to Cleo appeared as the musical guest at Geek Bowl XII, the twelfth annual event of its kind put on by Geeks Who Drink Pub Quizzes. The event took place in the band's hometown of Boston on Saturday, February 17, 2018.

The band released their holiday EP Ok Christmas November 2019.

As of 2022 LTC have been playing reunion shows periodically in the Northeast and California. The lineup includes both Stacy Jones and Tom Polce alternating playing drums show to show along with Kay Hanley, Michael Eisenstein, Greg McKenna, and Joe Klompus.

Solo careers

Most of the band members also have solo careers. Most notable is Kay Hanley's career, which produced the albums Cherry Marmalade in 2002, The Babydoll EP in 2004, and Weaponize in 2008. She provided singing vocals for Rachael Leigh Cook in the 2001 film Josie and the Pussycats. In 2003, Hanley collaborated with Sega and musician Jun Senoue for the song "Follow Me" in the video game Sonic Heroes.  Hanley has also been involved with Disney on several children's projects, including the Disney Channel's My Friends Tigger & Pooh, as well as writing all original songs for Disney Junior's hit series, Doc McStuffins.

Michael Eisenstein has been doing session work and touring work for many artists including Our Lady Peace and Lisa Loeb. He is a producer and engineer.

Hanley and Eisenstein married in the late '90s and have two children, Zoe Mabel and Henry Aaron (named for legendary baseball Hall Of Famer). They split up in 2010.

Drummer Stacy Jones went on to form American Hi-Fi with fellow Boston musicians Drew Parsons, Jamie Arentzen and Brian Nolan. In addition to being the musical director and drummer for Miley Cyrus, Jones is also the musical director for Life of Dillon. Previous gigs also include playing drums for Matchbox Twenty, Madonna, Dia Frampton, Veruca Salt, Avril Lavigne, Ariana Grande, Joan Jett, Against Me!, The Jonas Brothers, The Flaming Lips, Lily Allen, Billy Ray Cyrus, Sheryl Crow, Cobra Starship, Aimee Mann, The Cab, Hey Monday, Butch Walker, and more.

Scott Riebling went into the production side of music. He has produced work for The Von Bondies, Cobra Starship and Fall Out Boy. Riebling resides in Massachusetts. His brother Eric Riebling plays bass in Pittsburgh band The Affordable Floors. He co-owns a pizza chain (Stoked Pizza) located in the Boston area.

Co-founding member Greg McKenna is playing live with his new band, City Rivals. McKenna resides in Dorchester, Massachusetts.

Tom Polce played with several prominent Boston-based bands and is a producer and engineer. He lives in California.

Band members
Current members
Kay Hanley – lead vocals, rhythm guitar (1990–2000, 2008–2009, 2014, 2016–present)
Greg McKenna – lead guitar, backing vocals (1990–2000, 2008–2009, 2014, 2016–present)
Michael Eisenstein – rhythm guitar, keyboards, backing vocals (1992–2000, 2008–2009, 2014, 2016–present)
Joe Klompus – bass, backing vocals (2008–2009, 2016–present)
Stacy Jones – drums, percussion (1994–1997, 2008–2009, 2014, 2016–present)

Former members
Tom Polce – drums (1997)
Jason Sutter – drums (1997–2000)
Scott Riebling – bass, backing vocals (1994–2000)
Abe Laboriel Jr - drums (1992 - 1993)
Brian Karp - bass (1991-1993)

Discography

Studio albums

Other albums

Cassettes

Singles

In popular culture
Ben Wyatt (Adam Scott) wears a Letters to Cleo shirt on the show Parks and Recreation on multiple occasions while he is between jobs. Letters To Cleo also makes an appearance on the show, playing during the Pawnee/Eagleton Unity Concert in the last episode of Season 6.

See also
List of alternative music artists

References

External links

Kay and USA Mike's Lynx

Musical groups established in 1990
Musical groups disestablished in 2000
Alternative rock groups from Massachusetts
American pop punk groups
Musical groups reestablished in 2008
Musical groups reestablished in 2014
Musical groups reestablished in 2016
Musical groups from Boston
American power pop groups
Female-fronted musical groups